Super Channel Entertainment Network (Formally and commonly known as Super Channel) is a Canadian English language premium cable and satellite television channel owned by Allarco Entertainment 2008 Inc. Super Channel's programming primarily includes theatrically released, first to television motion pictures and television series, along with documentaries and other niche programs.

The current Super Channel service was launched in 2007, and is not affiliated with the two pre-existing English-language premium channels which used the name at various times prior to 2001, which were later known as Movie Central (in Western Canada; defunct since March 2016) and The Movie Network (in Eastern Canada; merged with and relaunched as Crave in 2018). The Allards were the original owners of Movie Central, and later re-acquired rights to the Superchannel trademark. Prior to 2016, Super Channel was the first and only general-interest English-language pay television service authorized to operate nationally. Family Channel (with its multiplex channel Family Jr.) was the only other national pay television channel, though it currently operates as a de facto basic tier specialty channel.

Super Channel is available on nearly all major cable and satellite providers including Telus Optik TV, Bell Satellite TV, Shaw Direct, Access Communications, Cogeco, Rogers Cable, Shaw Cable, Eastlink, SaskTel, Westman Communications, Bell MTS, Novus, VMedia, RiverTV, and other providers. Super Channel was granted as a "must carry" service by the Canadian Radio-television and Telecommunications Commission (CRTC), meaning all television service providers must carry the service on their systems.

History

Pre-Launch

Allarco was one of four applicants for new pay television licences that were considered at a public hearing held by the Canadian Radio-television and Telecommunications Commission on October 24, 2005. Its competing applicants were:
 BOOMTV, to be operated by the Archambault unit of Quebecor Media. While it was expected to compete directly with the existing general-interest services – The Movie Network (now Crave) and Movie Central (TMN/MC) in English Canada and Super Écran (SE) in French Canada – Archambault indicated that its services would have regularly favoured first-run dramatic series. Archambault was also the only applicant for a French-language service, but indicated that this licence would be worthless without an English counterpart.
 The Canadian Film Channel, proposed by Channel Zero Inc. It proposed to broadcast 100% Canadian content and be funded entirely by the operators of TMN/MC, in an amount equal to 12.9% of these services' gross revenues, to be required by condition of licence. Neither incumbent indicated approval for such a use of its revenues.
 Spotlight Television, to be controlled by George Burger, a former executive at Alliance Television, and professional sports mogul Larry Tanenbaum, chairman of the private investment company Kilmer Van Nostrand, which proposed a premium service much in the same vein as The Movie Network/Movie Central. It is believed that, had Spotlight's application been successful, it would have been branded as a Canadian version of the American service HBO; an "HBO Canada" channel was launched in October 2008 under the auspices of TMN/MC.

The Allarco application was approved on May 18, 2006, while the other three applicants were rejected.

The Allard family were also the original owners of Movie Central, which during their stewardship until 2001 was known as "Superchannel", rendered as a single word title unlike the current service (for a time in the 1980s, First Choice (now The Movie Network) had also used the "Superchannel" name under a co-branding agreement). The "Movie Central" name was adopted shortly after Corus Entertainment acquired the service, but Corus maintained ownership of the "Superchannel" trademark. Just before the new channel's launch, the Allards re-acquired the rights to the "Superchannel" name under undisclosed terms.

Super Channel was launched on November 2, 2007, on Bell Satellite TV.

Bankruptcy and Reemergence 
Super Channel's parent company, Allarco Entertainment, entered into the Companies' Creditors Arrangement Act on June 18, 2009. On August 31, 2010, its creditors unanimously approved a restructuring plan for the company under the act. The restructuring plan, which needed approval of the court, was later approved.

On May 26, 2016, Allarco filed for bankruptcy a second time. The next round of submissions to the court are due April 21, 2017 meaning the creditor protection is still open. As part of this process 96 of the 135 licensed content agreements were terminated.

On February 15, 2017, it was announced that a Canadian version of Ginx TV would launch as a replacement for one of Super Channel's multiplex channels. Replacing Super Channel 4, Ginx eSports TV Canada launched on May 4, 2017, with a live Canadian edition of The Bridge, a late night talk show.

On February 22, 2017, Super Channel announced it had acquired the Canadian broadcast rights to the Legends Football League, as part of a three-year deal in which Super Channel will be the exclusive Canadian broadcaster of all LFL games through the 2019 season. The LFL will be used to launch the "Super Channel SPORTS" sub-brand that will be used for all sporting events and sports-themed programming. Super Channel 1 debuted LFL Football Night on April 22, 2017.

On April 4, 2017, Super Channel announced that it would rebrand Super Channel 3 as Super Channel VAULT on April 28, 2017. The channel is described as offering programming based on "a collection of hand-picked, fan-favourites, critically-acclaimed films."

In 2018, after emerging from creditor protection, Allarco announced the relaunch of Super Channel with the rebranding of SC1 and SC2 as Super Channel Fuse and Super Channel Heart & Home and the service adopting the Super Channel Entertainment Network branding.

In 2020, the service announced a partnership with the Canadian Film Festival, and broadcast the films that had been slated to premiere at the festival prior to its cancellation due to the COVID-19 pandemic in Canada.

Channels

List of channels
Depending on the service provider, Super Channel provides up to eight multiplex channels – four 24-hour multiplex channels, all of which are simulcast in both standard definition and high definition – as well as a subscription video-on-demand service (Super Channel On Demand). Super Channel broadcasts its primary channel and multiplex channels on an Eastern Time Zone schedule, operating a singular feed for all channels, this results in the difference in local airtimes for a particular movie or program between two geographic locations being three hours at most.

Other services

Super Channel HD
Super Channel HD is a high definition simulcast feed of Super Channel that broadcasts in the 1080i resolution format. In addition to its main channel, Super Channel also operates high definition simulcast feeds of all three multiplex channels. Initially, Allarco launched two high definition feeds upon the launch of the service in November 2007: Super Channel HD 1 and Super Channel HD 2. Super Channel HD 1 simulcast the standard definition feed of the same name, while Super Channel HD 2 initially aired programming from the three remaining SD feeds. In February 2013, Allarco launched HD feeds for the two remaining channels, Super Channel 3 and Super Channel 4, with each HD channel now simulcasting their standard definition equivalent.

Super Channel On Demand
Super Channel operates a subscription video-on-demand television service called Super Channel On Demand, which is available at no additional charge to new and existing subscribers of Super Channel. Content featured on the service includes movies, acquired foreign series and special features previously seen on the linear television network.

Programming
Super Channel's main programming consists of television series and both theatrically released and made for TV movies, including domestically produced programming, shows acquired from U.S cable networks, foreign films, and international series.

From its launch until December 2015, Super Channel was the broadcaster for 20th Century Fox films from January 2007 to February 2015. The Movie Network took over the deal in January 2016 for releases starting in March 2015, and shared with Disney+ effective 2021, sister channel Starz Canada broadcasts the entire back catalogue.

Original programs

24 Hour Rental
Bullet in the Face
Clay's POV
Darknet
Dark Rising: Warrior of Worlds
Fight Xchange
Forgive Me
Hollywood & Vines
Naked News Uncovered
The Next Take
Olympus
Slasher (2017, moved to Netflix after the first season)
Spooksville
Tiny Plastic Men
Too Much Information
Versailles
What Would Sal Do?
When Calls the Heart

References

External links
 
 Allarco Entertainment 2008 Inc.

English-language television stations in Canada
Commercial-free television networks
Companies based in Edmonton
Movie channels in Canada
Television channels and stations established in 2007
2007 establishments in Canada